Cdc42 effector protein 3 is a protein that in humans is encoded by the CDC42EP3 gene.

CDC42, a small Rho GTPase, regulates the formation of F-actin-containing structures through its interaction with the downstream effector proteins. The protein encoded by this gene is a member of the Borg family of CDC42 effector proteins. Borg family proteins contain a CRIB (Cdc42/Rac interactive-binding) domain. They bind to, and negatively regulate the function of, CDC42. This protein can interact with CDC42, as well as with the ras homolog gene family, member Q (ARHQ/TC10). Expression of this protein in fibroblasts has been shown to induce pseudopodia formation.

Interactions
CDC42EP3 has been shown to interact with CDC42 and RHOQ.

References

External links

Further reading